Les Misérables is a 1958 film adaptation of the 1862 Victor Hugo novel. Written by Michel Audiard and René Barjavel, the film was directed by Jean-Paul Le Chanois and stars Jean Gabin as Jean Valjean.

Adaptation
The bishop's background is briefly sketched rather than detailed as in the novel. Javert is a young boy, the son of a guard in the Toulon prison, when he sees Valjean as a convict. Fantine's body, instead of being thrown into a public grave unceremoniously after Javert arrested Jean Valjean, was still in her deathbed after Jean Valjean escaped jail, and he pays Sister Simplice to bury her properly. Javert comes to arrest Jean Valjean when he is in the house of Thénardier intending to take Cosette with him. Sister Simplice admits Valjean and Cosette to the convent instead of Father Fauchevent. Thénardier, in disguise, meets Marius and proves to him with the help of newspaper clippings that he is completely mistaken about Valjean's criminal past.

Cast

Production
Called "the most memorable film version", it was filmed in East Germany and was overtly political. Of the many film adaptations of the novel, this has been called "the one most popular with audiences in postwar France". One noteworthy plot change was made to accommodate the fact that the actors playing the roles of Valjean and Javert were far apart in age, rather than near contemporaries as in the novel. Instead of Javert recognizing Valjean as a convict he had often guarded years earlier, he remembers how, when he was just a boy, his prison guard father had pointed out this man as "the worst kind of prisoner, who tried to escape four times".

Release
The movie was a massive hit in France, the second most popular of 1958.

The New York Times described it as one of the first French "blockbusters" that appeared in response to such lengthy feature films as Around the World in 80 Days and The Ten Commandments. It said it was "a ponderous four-hour retelling of Victor Hugo's oft-filmed epic. ... Not a page is skipped ... Too literary, it has the saving grace of Jean Gabin's truly heroic depiction of Jean Valjean plus some stirring scenes on the barricades." It was a "quintessential Gabin role ... that of a loner, an outsider, usually a member of the lower orders who may flirt with love and happiness but knows they are not for him".

The film did not premiere in New York until July 1989, when it ran to coincide with the celebration of the bicentennial of the French Revolution.

See also
 Adaptations of Les Misérables

References

External links
 
 Les Miserables at Box Office Story
 Review by film historian Tim Brayton

Films based on Les Misérables
1958 films
East German films
1950s French-language films
Films directed by Jean-Paul Le Chanois
Films based on French novels
Films set in France
Films set in Paris
Films shot in Germany
Films shot in Paris
Films with screenplays by Michel Audiard
Films with screenplays by René Barjavel
1950s historical drama films
German historical drama films
French historical drama films
Italian historical drama films
Pathé films
1958 drama films
Films scored by Alessandro Cicognini
1950s Italian films
1950s French films
1950s German films